Bishop LeBlond High School is a private, Roman Catholic high school in St. Joseph, Missouri.  It is located in the Roman Catholic Diocese of Kansas City-Saint Joseph.

Background
Bishop LeBlond High School was established as an all-girls school in 1960 by the Benedictine Sisters (O.S.B.) of Atchison, KS.  It succeeded Convent of the Sacred Heart (which was located at 12th and Messanie Streets) when the Madames of the Sacred Heart (R.S.C.J.) withdrew from St. Joseph.  It was named after Bishop Charles H. LeBlond, former Bishop of the diocese.  It became coeducational when the all-boys Christian Brothers High School closed in 1970.

External links
 School Website

Notes and references

Roman Catholic Diocese of Kansas City–Saint Joseph
Catholic secondary schools in Missouri
Buildings and structures in St. Joseph, Missouri
Educational institutions established in 1960
Midland Empire Conference
Schools in Buchanan County, Missouri
1960 establishments in Missouri